Valier may refer to:

Places
 Valier, Illinois, a village in the United States
 Valier, Montana, a town in the United States
 Villa Duodo, also known as "Villa Valier", in Veneto district, Italy
 Valier (crater), an impact crater on the Moon

People
Bertuccio Valier (1596 – 1658), the 102nd Doge of Venice
Silvestro Valier (1630 – 1700), the 109th Doge of Venice
 Max Valier (1895 – 1930), Austrian rocketry pioneer

Literature
 Valier (Middle-earth), female angelic or semi-divine beings in J. R. R. Tolkien's legendarium